Essenbach is a municipality in the district of Landshut, in Bavaria, Germany. It is situated 9 km northeast of Landshut.

It is the site of Isar Nuclear Power Plant.

Twin towns
Essenbach is twinned with:

  Savigneux, Loire, France, since 1997
  Savignano Irpino, Italy, since 2005

References

Landshut (district)